Jacqueline Joubert (29 March 1921 – 8 January 2005), born Jacqueline Annette Édith Pierre, was a French television continuity announcer, producer and director. Alongside Arlette Accart, Joubert was one of the first two in-vision continuity announcers (or speakerines) when television commenced in France after the Second World War.

Life

She was married to the journalist Georges de Caunes (1953–60), was the mother of Canal+ TV star Antoine de Caunes, and the grandmother of actress Emma de Caunes. She had also been married to Philippe Lagier. Alongside continuity duties, she presented the 1959 and 1961 Eurovision Song Contests from Cannes. She began to produce and direct entertainment shows in 1966 before switching to producing children's programming for Antenne 2 between 1970 and 1980 - in the process, devising the popular magazine show Récré A2 and launching the television career of singer and actress Dorothée. She died in Neuilly-sur-Seine, France in 2005, aged 83.

Selected filmography
 Paris Still Sings (1951)
 First Criminal Brigade (1962)

See also
 List of Eurovision Song Contest presenters

References

External links
Evene.fr in French.

1921 births
2005 deaths
Radio and television announcers
French television presenters
French women television presenters
French radio presenters
French women radio presenters
20th-century French women